Honiatyn  is a village in the administrative district of Gmina Dołhobyczów, within Hrubieszów County, Lublin Voivodeship, in eastern Poland, close to the border with Ukraine.

The village has a population of 70.

References

Honiatyn